Takehiko (written: 武彦, 毅彦, 雄彦 or 岳彦) is a masculine Japanese given name. Notable people with the name include:

 (born 1969), Japanese sumo wrestler
 (1922–1999), Japanese baseball player and manager
 (1938–2019), Japanese politician
 (born 1967), Japanese manga artist
, Japanese manga artist
 (born 1938), Japanese footballer
 (born 1961), Japanese baseball player
 (1874–1960), Japanese writer
, Japanese basketball player
 (1898–1987), Japanese prince and Imperial Japanese Navy officer

Japanese masculine given names